Nepean High School (often abbreviated to NHS) is a high school in Ottawa, Ontario, Canada. It is located in the Westboro neighbourhood, at 574 Broadview Avenue. There were 1160 students enrolled for 2011–2012. Alan Johnson is the current principal  replacing Kristy MacNamara, the principal from 2018 to 2019. The two current vice principals are Christy Armstrong and Peter Campbell.

History
The school began as a continuation program at Broadview Public School. Students who wanted some years of secondary education, but were unable to travel to Ottawa Collegiate Institute could take a few courses on the top floor of Broadview. In 1919, the provincial government made school attendance mandatory until age 16, creating a rapid increase in enrollment. Carleton County thus decided to build a new high school, and Nepean High School, in Nepean Township, was founded in 1922. Nepean High School originally served a large territory west of Ottawa. In 1950, Westboro was annexed by the city of Ottawa, and the high school became part of the Ottawa Collegiate Board. In 1970, the Ottawa Collegiate Board was merged into the Ottawa Board of Education, and then in 1998, the Ottawa Board of Education and the Carleton Board of Education were amalgamated. Nepean High School then became part of the new Ottawa-Carleton District School Board.

Academics
Nepean is known for its strong academic success with roughly 94% of students graduating to higher education (53% being Ontario Scholars).

Nepean's curricular offerings include
Academic/University,
Applied/College,
French Immersion,
Extended French,
Specialist High Skills Major in the Environment,
Advanced Placement Courses,
Leadership Development, and
Cooperative Education courses.

Athletics
The school is also well known for its excellent athletics program, with over 10 sports teams that are regular top contenders in the National Capital Secondary Schools Athletic Association. 

Nepean boasts one of the highest number of interscholastic sports teams in the Ottawa Carleton District School Board.  Nepean was ranked first overall in the inaugural Ottawa Citizen High School Sports Rankings in 2006, and placed 3rd in 2009, 5th in 2010, and 3rd in 2011.  Nepean attended the Ontario Championships (OFSAA) in boys Rugby (2015, 2016), boys Soccer (2007), girls Soccer (2010), X-Country (2006–2011), Golf (2007–2011), Alpine Skiing (2007–2011), Nordic Skiing (2006–2011), Track & Field (2006–2011), Field Hockey (2011, 2015, 2016), Tennis (2010–2011), and Swimming (2008–2011).  The boys Non-Contact Hockey won city championships in 2004, 2006, 2007 and 2008, the Junior Boys Basketball Team won the city championships in 2019 and the boys Rugby team has toured worldwide (Alberta 2004, UK 2005, and Australia 2007, 2009, 2012).

Notable alumni

Mike Crawley – politician and business leader
Tyler Brûlé – journalist and magazine publisher
Bruce Cockburn – acoustic folk musician
Jason Kralt – former CFL player
Kevin O'Leary – entrepreneur, television personality  (Dragons' Den, Shark Tank, The Lang and O'Leary Exchange)
Maria del Mar – Gemini and ACTRA winning actress
Mark Rowswell – media personality 
Dustin Cook – Canadian World Cup alpine ski racer 

Peter Wintonick – Canadian documentary film maker and Governor General Award Winner.
David Williams – former professional road cyclist.
Sarah Weinman - Journalist and author.

See also
List of high schools in Ontario

References

External links 
School Website
OCDSB Website

Educational institutions established in 1922
High schools in Ottawa
1922 establishments in Ontario